Alejandro 'Álex' Serrano García (born 6 February 1995) is a Spanish professional footballer who plays as a central or attacking midfielder for Bulgarian First League club FC Hebar Pazardzhik.

Club career
Born in Barcelona, Catalonia, Serrano finished his development with Sporting de Gijón's cantera. He made his senior debut at only 15 with the reserves in the 2010–11 season, in Segunda División B.

In August 2013, Serrano was promoted to the main squad which competed in Segunda División. He played his first game as a professional on 12 January of the following year, starting in a 0–0 away draw against CD Tenerife.

Serrano signed with RCD Espanyol on 22 June 2015, being assigned to the B side also in the third division. On 8 July of the following year he moved to another reserve team, RCD Mallorca B of the same league.

On 30 January 2018, after six competitive appearances with Mallorca's first team, Serrano joined Celta de Vigo B. He went on to represent, in quick succession and still in the third tier, Salamanca CF UDS, CF Talavera de la Reina and UE Cornellà.

Serrano made his debut in top-flight football in the 2021–22 campaign, signing with GKS Górnik Łęczna of the Polish Ekstraklasa. His first match in the competition took place on 13 September 2021, when he came on as a late substitute for Damian Gąska in the 3–2 home win over Wisła Płock. On 1 September 2022, he left the club by mutual consent.

Personal life
Serrano's father, Bernardino, was also a footballer. He too represented Sporting Gijón, and also played for Real Madrid.

References

External links

1995 births
Living people
Spanish footballers
Footballers from Barcelona
Association football midfielders
Segunda División players
Segunda División B players
Sporting de Gijón B players
Sporting de Gijón players
RCD Espanyol B footballers
RCD Mallorca B players
RCD Mallorca players
Celta de Vigo B players
Salamanca CF UDS players
CF Talavera de la Reina players
UE Cornellà players
Ekstraklasa players
I liga players
Górnik Łęczna players
First Professional Football League (Bulgaria) players
FC Hebar Pazardzhik players
Spain youth international footballers
Spanish expatriate footballers
Expatriate footballers in Poland
Expatriate footballers in Bulgaria
Spanish expatriate sportspeople in Poland
Spanish expatriate sportspeople in Bulgaria